Timia carbonaria, meaning "stirrup shell," is a species of ulidiid or picture-winged fly in the genus Timia of the family Ulidiidae.

References

Ulidiidae
Insects described in 1908